Wilhelm Schlag (born May 2, 1969) is a mathematician and Phillips Professor of Mathematics at Yale University. He is known for his work in harmonic analysis and partial differential equations.

Career 
Schlag obtained his PhD at the California Institute of Technology in 1996 under the supervision of Thomas Wolff. Since then, he has held positions at Princeton University, California Institute of Technology and the University of Chicago where he was H. J. Livingston Professor of Mathematics before moving to Yale University in 2018. He has done extensive work in Fourier Analysis, Spectral theory and dispersive partial differential equations.

Awards and honors 
 Sloan Fellow, 2001
 Guggenheim Fellow, 2009 
 Invited Speaker, International Congress of Mathematicians, 2014

References

External links
Homepage at Yale University

California Institute of Technology alumni
Yale University faculty
Princeton University faculty
California Institute of Technology faculty
University of Chicago faculty
Sloan Fellows
20th-century American mathematicians
1969 births
21st-century American mathematicians
Living people